Michel de Certeau  (17 May 1925 – 9 January 1986) was a French Jesuit priest and scholar whose work combined history, psychoanalysis, philosophy, and the social sciences as well as hermeneutics, semiotics, ethnology, and religion. He was known as a philosopher of everyday life and widely regarded as a historian who had interests ranging from travelogues of the sixteenth and seventeenth centuries to contemporary urban life.

A multidisciplinarian, he wrote ground-breaking studies in fields as diverse as mysticism, the act of faith, cultural dynamics in contemporary society, and historiography as an intellectual practice. His impact continues unabated, with new volumes appearing regularly, and perhaps surprisingly his reputation is growing even more rapidly in English and German-speaking countries and the Mediterranean than in his native France. This strong and growing interest in academia is not matched in the public sphere, however, partly due to his being considered a "difficult" author because of his highly personal style which makes translation difficult, and partly due to the declining status of French in the world generally. Nevertheless, portions of his voluminous output have been translated into a dozen languages.

Education
Michel Jean Emmanuel de La Barge de Certeau was born in 1925 in Chambéry, Savoie.  De Certeau's education was eclectic, following the medieval tradition of peregrinatio academica. After obtaining degrees in classics and philosophy at the universities of Grenoble and Lyon, he studied the works of Pierre Favre (1506–1546) at the École pratique des hautes études (Paris) with Jean Orcibal. He undertook religious training at a seminary in Lyon, where he entered the Jesuit order (Society of Jesus) in 1950 and was ordained in 1956.  De Certeau entered the Society of Jesus hoping to do missionary work in China. In the year of his ordination, de Certeau became one of the founders of the journal Christus, with which he would actively be involved for much of his life. In 1960 he earned his doctorate ("thèse de 3e Cycle") at the Sorbonne with a study of co-founder of the Society of Jesus Pierre Favre (the Sorbonne is a secular state university where theology may not be taught) before embarking on his celebrated study of Jean-Joseph Surin.

Professional life 
De Certeau was greatly influenced by Sigmund Freud and was, along with Jacques Lacan, one of the founding members of École Freudienne de Paris, an informal group which served as a focal point for French scholars interested in psychoanalysis. He came to public attention after publishing an article dealing with the May 1968 events in France. He also took part in Robert Jaulin's department of ethnology at the University of Paris-VII after May 68.

De Certeau went on to teach at several universities in locations as diverse as Geneva, San Diego, and Paris. Through the 1970s and 1980s he produced a string of works that demonstrated his interest in mysticism, phenomenology, and psychoanalysis.  He died in Paris, aged 60, from pancreatic cancer.

The Practice of Everyday Life
De Certeau's most well-known and influential work in the United States has been The Practice of Everyday Life, cited in fields such as rhetoric, performance studies, and law. In The Practice of Everyday Life, de Certeau combined his disparate scholarly interests to develop a theory of the productive and consumptive activity inherent in everyday life.  According to de Certeau, everyday life is distinctive from other practices of daily existence because it is repetitive and unconscious. De Certeau’s study of everyday life is neither the study of “popular culture”, nor is it necessarily the study of everyday resistances to regimes of power.  Instead, he attempts to outline the way individuals unconsciously navigate everything from city streets to literary texts.

The Practice of Everyday Life distinguishes between the concepts of strategy and tactics.  De Certeau links "strategies" with institutions and structures of power who are the "producers", while individuals are "consumers" or "poachers," acting in accordance with, or against, environments defined by strategies by using "tactics".  In the chapter "Walking in the City", de Certeau asserts that "the city" is generated by the strategies of governments, corporations, and other institutional bodies who produce things like maps that describe the city as a unified whole.  De Certeau uses the vantage from the World Trade Center in New York to illustrate the idea of a synoptic, unified view.  By contrast, the walker at street level moves in ways that are tactical and never fully determined by the plans of organizing bodies, taking shortcuts in spite of the strategic grid of the streets. De Certeau's argument is that everyday life works by a process of poaching on the territory of others, using the rules and products that already exist in culture in a way that is influenced, but never wholly determined, by those rules and products.

According to Andrew Blauvelt, who relies on the work of de Certeau in his essay on design and everyday life:

De Certeau's investigations into the realm of routine practices, or the "arts of doing" such as walking, talking, reading, dwelling, and cooking, were guided by his belief that despite repressive aspects of modern society, there exists an element of creative resistance to these structures enacted by ordinary people. In The Practice of Everyday Life, de Certeau outlines an important critical distinction between strategies and tactics in this battle of repression and expression. According to him, strategies are used by those within organizational power structures, whether small or large, such as the state or municipality, the corporation or the proprietor, a scientific enterprise or the scientist. Strategies are deployed against some external entity to institute a set of relations for official or proper ends, whether adversaries, competitors, clients, customers, or simply subjects. Tactics, on the other hand, are employed by those who are subjugated. By their very nature tactics are defensive and opportunistic, used in more limited ways and seized momentarily within spaces, both physical and psychological, produced and governed by more powerful strategic relations.

The Writing of History
His work The Writing of History, translated into English after his death, deals with the relationship between history and religion.  De Certeau makes a point in linking the history of writing history to the legitimization of political power and that "Western" traditions of history involve using the act of writing as a tool of colonialism; writing their own histories while un-writing the embodied traditions of native peoples.

Major works
In French:
La Culture au Pluriel. Union Générale d'Editions,1974.
L'Ecriture de l'Histoire. Editions Gallimard. 1975.
La Fable Mystique. vol. 1, XVIe-XVIIe Siècle. Editions Gallimard. 1982.
Histoire et psychanalyse entre science et fiction. Editions Gallimard. 1987. (Rev.ed. 2002)
La Faiblesse de Croire. Edited by Luce Giard. Seuil. 1987.
L'Invention du Quotidien. Vol. 1, Arts de Faire. Union générale d'éditions 10-18. 1980.
With Dominique Julia and Jacques Revel. Une Politique de la Langue : La Révolution Française et les Patois, l'enquête de Grégoire. Gallimard. 1975.
La Possession de Loudun. Gallimard. 1970.

In English:
The Capture of Speech and Other Political Writings. Translated by Tom Conley. University of Minnesota Press. 1998.
The Certeau Reader. Edited by Graham Ward. Blackwell Publishers. 1999.
Culture in the Plural. Translated by Tom Conley. University of Minnesota Press. 1998.
Heterologies: Discourse on the Other. Translated by Brain Massumi. University of Minnesota Press. 1986.
The Mystic Fable, Volume One: The Sixteenth and Seventeenth Centuries. Translated by Michael B. Smith. University of Chicago Press. 1995, .
The Mystic Fable, Volume Two: The Sixteenth and Seventeenth Centuries. Translated by Michael B. Smith. University of Chicago Press. 2015, .
The Practice of Everyday Life. Translated by Steven Rendall. University of California Press. 1984.
With Luce Giard and Pierre Mayol. The Practice of Everyday Life. Vol. 2, Living and Cooking. Translated by Timothy J. Tomasik. University of Minnesota Press. 1998.
The Possession at Loudun. Translated by Michael B. Smith. University of Chicago Press. 2000, .
The Writing of History. Translated by Tom Conley. Columbia University Press. 1988.

References

Further reading
 Benjamins, Jacob. “The Politics of Wandering in Michel de Certeau.” Political Theology: The Journal of Christian Socialism 19, no. 1 (2018): 50–60.
 Highmore, Ben.(2001). “Obligation to the Ordinary: Michel de Certeau, Ethnography and Ethics.” Strategies: Journal of Theory, Culture & Politics. 14, no. 2: 253–63.
Michel de Certeau: Analysing Culture. By Ben Highmore. Continuum. 2006.
Michel de Certeau: Interpretation and Its Other. By Jeremy Ahearne. Stanford University Press. 1996.
Michel de Certeau: Cultural Theorist. By Ian Buchanan. Sage Press. 2000.
Michel de Certeau-In the Plural. A special issue of South Atlantic Quarterly, edited by Ian Buchanan. Duke University Press. 2001.
Michel de Certeau. Lo storico smarrito. By Diana Napoli. Morcelliana. 2014
Michel de Certeau. Un teatro della soggettivita'., edited by Diana Napoli, a special issue of Aut Aut, 369. 2016.
Michel de Certeau. By Giuseppe Riggio. Morcelliana. 2016.

1925 births
1986 deaths
Writers from Chambéry
Grenoble Alpes University alumni
University of Lyon alumni
University of Paris alumni
20th-century French writers
20th-century French male writers
20th-century French philosophers
20th-century French Jesuits
Roman Catholic writers
Catholic philosophers
French male writers
French male essayists
20th-century French essayists
Clergy  from Chambéry
Microhistorians